"Guilty" is a song by British boy band Blue from their third album, Guilty. It was co-written by Gary Barlow of the British boy band Take That. Released as a single on 20 October 2003, "Guilty" peaked at  2 on the UK Singles Chart and entered the top 40 in several other countries, including Denmark, where it debuted at No. 1.

Track listings
UK CD1
 "Guilty"
 "Too Close"

UK CD2
 "Guilty" – 3:44
 "Rock the Night" – 3:21
 "Back It Up" – 3:29
 "Guilty" (video) – 3:44

UK DVD single
 "Guilty" (video) – 3:44
 "Back It Up" (picture gallery) – 3:21
 "Guilty Instrumental" (picture gallery) – 3:29

Credits and personnel
Credits are taken from the UK CD2 liner notes.

 Gary Barlow – writing
 Eliot Kennedy – writing
 Timothy Woodcock – writing
 Duncan James – writing
 Blue – all vocals
 John Themis – guitar

 True North – production
 Martin Harrington – production
 Ash Howes – production, mixing
 Reece Gilmore – programming
 Simon Hale – string arrangement, conductor
 Gavyn Wright – concertmaster

Charts

Weekly charts

Year-end charts

Release history

References

2003 singles
2003 songs
Blue (English band) songs
Innocent Records singles
Number-one singles in Denmark
Song recordings produced by Eliot Kennedy
Songs written by Gary Barlow
Songs written by Duncan James
Songs written by Eliot Kennedy
Songs written by Tim Woodcock
Virgin Records singles